Christopher Ballard  is a former politician in Ontario, Canada. He was a Liberal member of the Legislative Assembly of Ontario from 2014 to 2018 who represented the riding of Newmarket—Aurora. He was a member of cabinet in the government of Kathleen Wynne.

Background
Attended King City Secondary School where upon graduation had aspirations of becoming a Marine Biologist.

Ballard was a journalist with the Newmarket Era, the Aurora Banner, the Orillia Packet and Times, Canadian Press and the Toronto Star. He has run his own business consultancy firm CSB Communications with clients in the business, education, association sectors in Ontario. He was also the Executive Director for a consumers advocacy group. He lives in Aurora with his wife Audrey where they raised three children.

Ballard was presented with an honorary lifetime member award by Speaker of the Ontario Legislature, Michael A. Brown, on behalf of the Public Affairs Association of Canada. Ballard is a former president of the association and was recognized for his years of dedication to the association.

Politics
Ballard was elected as a town councillor in Aurora in 2010 and vacated his council seat before finishing a full term.

He ran in the 2014 provincial election as the Liberal candidate in the riding of Newmarket-Aurora, a long-time PC held riding north of Toronto. In a surprising upset, he defeated Progressive Conservative candidate Jane Twinney by 3,432 votes. Ballard's win was part of a strong showing by the Ontario Liberals in the York Region, where the party had a historically strong showing in many traditionally PC and swing ridings.

He previously served as parliamentary assistant to the Minister of Government and Consumer Services. In June 2016, he was appointed to cabinet as Minister of Housing and Minister Responsible for the Poverty-Reduction Strategy.

After the resignation of Glen Murray as Minister of Environment and Climate Change on July 31, 2017, Ballard was appointed his successor by Premier Kathleen Wynne.

While MPP Ballard moved bill 42 to directly elect the chair of the Region of York. This was never realized as it was reversed in July 2018.

He ran for re-election in the 2018 provincial election and was defeated soundly, coming in 3rd in the riding of Newmarket-Aurora with less than 23% of the vote. Ballard's loss was part of a weak showing by the Ontario Liberals who retained only 7 seats and lost official party status.

He ran in the 2018 municipal election for Mayor of the Town of Aurora and was soundly defeated, coming in 3rd with less than 20% of the vote.

Ballard exited politics in 2019 to be the CEO of Passive House Canada.

Cabinet positions

Election results

References

External links

21st-century Canadian politicians
Canadian columnists
Canadian newspaper reporters and correspondents
Living people
Members of the Executive Council of Ontario
Ontario Liberal Party MPPs
Ontario municipal councillors
People from King, Ontario
Toronto Star people
Year of birth missing (living people)